The 2007–08 season of the Belgian First Division began on August 3, 2007 and concluded on May 10, 2008. The championship was decided in the 31st round on April 20, 2008, when Standard Liège beat Anderlecht 2–0 at home. For Standard it was their 9th League Championship, but just their first in the last 25 years. At the other end of the table, Brussels and Sint-Truiden were relegated on matchdays 31 and 32 respectively. Behind Standard, Anderlecht and Club Brugge fought until the end for the second place which gives right to a place in the qualifying rounds of the 2008–09 UEFA Champions League. On the penultimate matchday, Anderlecht won against Club Brugge with 2–0 which proved decisive in the end for them to become second.

Clubs
Eighteen teams played in the Belgian First Division season 2007–08. Twelve teams were from Flanders, four clubs from Wallonia and two clubs from the Brussels-Capital Region.

New teams
K.S.K. Beveren had been relegated at the end of the previous season with F. C. Verbroedering Dender E.H. replacing them as they won the Belgian Second Division. Lierse lost their spot during the promotion playoff and were replaced by Y.R. K.V. Mechelen.

Overview

Managerial changes

Kits

Stadiums

League standings

Results

Season statistics

Scoring
First goal of the season: Marcin Wasilewski for Anderlecht against Mechelen (3 August 2007)
Widest winning margin: 6: Westerlo 6–0 Roeselare (20 October 2007)
Most goals in a match: 9: Westerlo 7–2 Brussels (19 January 2008)
Best offensive team: Cercle Brugge with 62 goals.
Best defensive team: Standard Liège with 19 goals.
Hattricks scored:
 Milan Jovanović for Standard Liège against Brussels (11 August 2007)
 Milan Jovanović for Standard Liège against Roeselare (25 August 2007)
 Joseph Akpala for Charleroi against Sint-Truiden (26 August 2007)
 Bertin Tomou for Mouscron against Dender EH (27 October 2007)
 Bryan Ruiz for Gent against Lokeren (8 December 2007)
 Elyaniv Barda for Genk against Zulte-Waregem (14 December 2007)
 Bart Van Den Eede for Westerlo against Brussels (19 January 2008)
 Joseph Akpala for Charleroi against Genk (12 April 2008)
 Nicolás Frutos for Anderlecht against Sint-Truiden (26 April 2008)

Cards
First yellow card: Nicolas Pareja for Anderlecht against Mechelen (3 August 2007)
First red card: Wim Mennes for Westerlo against Brussels (4 August 2007)

Top goal scorers
As of May 6, 2008:

† François Sterchele died on May 8, 2008 in a car crash and thus did not complete the full season.

References

See also
 2007–08 R.S.C. Anderlecht season

Belgian Pro League seasons
Belgian
1